

History 

St. Michael's College is a private national school which provides primary and secondary education. It was established in 2011 by W. S. R. Fernando.

College emblem 

The college logo symbolises the goals envisaged by its founders:

The book symbolizes wisdom and knowledge 
The star symbolizes shine with brightness
The Elephant symbolizes the strength
The key symbolizes leadership
The lamp symbolizes the light to the world

Location

St. Michael's College is located in Meegoda, Sri Lanka.

The college's main entrance is located at Puwakwatta Road, while Gate B is situated on a private road.

Schools in Colombo District